Chasmanthe floribunda is a species of flowering plant in the iris family which is known by the common name African flag. This plant is endemic to Cape Province in South Africa, but it has been introduced to other areas of similar climate, and is considered to be naturalized in California, Algeria, Australia, Argentina, and St. Helena.

Chasmanthe floribunda is a perennial herbaceous plant sprouting from a corm and producing clumps of long, narrow leaves. It erects one thin, tall stem which may approach a meter in height. Atop the stem is a spike inflorescence holding 20 to 40 flowers in neat vertical rows. The flower is a curving tube with a long upper lobe curving down over smaller lobes. From the mouth of the flower protrude the stamens with their large, hanging anthers, and the style. The flower is generally bright orange-red or scarlet on the upper lobe and yellow to orange in the lower lobes.

Chasmanthe emerges from the ground in autumn in the Western Cape, South Africa, after the first winter rains. It is frequented by sunbirds, which feed on the nectar it provides at this time of year. It flourishes and flowers in both sun and shade.

Varieties
 Chasmanthe floribunda var. duckittii G.J.Lewis ex L.Bolus 
 Chasmanthe floribunda var. floribunda – Yellow cobra lily

References

External links
Jepson Manual Treatment
USDA Plants Profile
Photo gallery

Iridaceae
Endemic flora of South Africa
Garden plants
Plants described in 1812
Taxa named by N. E. Brown
Taxa named by Richard Anthony Salisbury